Dulwich College Shanghai Pudong (Dulwich Pudong) is a British international school located in Pudong, Shanghai, China.

The language of instruction is English and the College is co-educational and non-denominational.

Academics and academic performance
The academic programme is based on the English National Curriculum for England and Wales. The College offers the International General Certificate of Secondary Education (IGCSE) in Years 10–11 and the International Baccalaureate Diploma Programme (IBDP) in Years 12 and 13.

Unlike in Dulwich College in the UK, the IB exam is used to determine university eligibility instead of the A-levels.

All students from year 1 on are required to study Mandarin Chinese.

In 2010 the average score for International Baccalaureate students was 34 of 45. 15% of Dulwich's students scored above a 40 that year. In 2010 about 75% of Dulwich Shanghai's IGCSE entries were A or A*.

Student body
As of 2011, the school had 1,350 students from 42 countries. 18% were Americans and 17% were British. Several other students' families originated from Australia, Hong Kong, Germany, South Africa, Pakistan, Kenya, India and Singapore.

Tuition
As of 2011 the school's annual tuition includes school uniforms and examination fees, while it does not include transport and lunch. Two-day toddler programmes have yearly tuitions of 27,700 renminbi (£2,619). Students in full-time sixth form college programmes have yearly tuitions of 220,600 RMB (£20,855).

See also

 Dulwich College Singapore
 Dulwich College Beijing
 Dulwich College
 Dulwich College Suzhou
 Dulwich International High School Suzhou
 Dulwich International High School Zhuhai

References

External links
 
 Dulwich College International website
 Dulwich school profile on Time Out Shanghai Family

Educational institutions established in 2003
International Baccalaureate schools in China
British international schools in Shanghai
Schools in Pudong
Shanghai
Association of China and Mongolia International Schools
2003 establishments in China